Francisco José "Fran" Sánchez Rodríguez (born 8 February 1990) is a Spanish professional footballer who plays for CDE Ursaria as a central defender.

Club career
Born in Alcalá de Henares, Community of Madrid, Rodríguez played only lower league football in his country, notably representing Atlético Madrid's reserves in the Segunda División B. Late into the 2014 January transfer window he joined Austrian Football First League club SV Mattersburg, contributing five games in his first full season to help it return to the Bundesliga after two years.

Rodríguez made his debut in top-flight football on 15 August 2015, being sent off early into an eventual 5–1 away loss against FK Austria Wien. He scored his first goal for the team on 22 October 2016, helping to a 2–2 draw at SK Sturm Graz by netting in the 95th minute.

References

External links
Mattersburg official profile 

1990 births
Living people
People from Alcalá de Henares
Spanish footballers
Footballers from the Community of Madrid
Association football defenders
Segunda División B players
Tercera División players
Tercera Federación players
RSD Alcalá players
Atlético Madrid C players
Atlético Madrid B players
CD Paracuellos Antamira players
2. Liga (Austria) players
Austrian Football Bundesliga players
SV Mattersburg players
Spanish expatriate footballers
Expatriate footballers in Austria
Spanish expatriate sportspeople in Austria